Upper and Lower Viscount Estates is an unincorporated community in Alberta, Canada within Sturgeon County that is recognized as a designated place by Statistics Canada. It is adjacent to the designated places of Bristol Oakes to the north and Lower Manor Estates to the north.

Demographics 

See also 
List of communities in Alberta
List of designated places in Alberta

References 

Designated places in Alberta